The free routine combination competition at 2013 World Aquatics Championships was held on July 21–27 with the preliminary round on July 21 and the final on July 27.

Results
The preliminary round was held on July 21 at 14:00 and the final on July 27 at 19:00.

Green denotes finalists

References

Synchronised swimming at the 2013 World Aquatics Championships